The 1919–20 Swiss National Ice Hockey Championship was the 10th edition of the national ice hockey championship in Switzerland. HC Bellerive Vevey won the championship as Akademischer EHC Zürich forfeited the final.

First round

Eastern Series 
 Akademischer EHC Zürich – SC Engelberg 2:0

Akademischer EHC Zürich qualified for the final.

Western Series 
HC Bellerive Vevey – HC Château-d'Oex 7:0

HC Bellerive Vevey qualified for the final.

Final 
 HC Bellerive Vevey – Akademischer EHC Zürich 3:0 Forfeit

External links 
Swiss Ice Hockey Federation – All-time results

National
Swiss National Ice Hockey Championship seasons